Jane Hardy is an Australian diplomat who was the Ambassador to Spain with non-resident accreditation to Andorra and Equatorial Guinea. Hardy has been Consul-General in Honolulu since December 22, 2017.

Education
Hardy earned a Masters of Arts degree from Monash University; a Graduate Diploma (Foreign Affairs and Trade) from the Australian National University; a Bachelor of Arts from Flinders University; and a Bachelor of Arts from the University of South Australia.

Termination of Ambassadorship to Spain
Less than two years into a three-year term, Hardy "ceased duty" on November 3, 2014, and "returned by mutual agreement with the department" after the Australian Federal Police arrested her husband Vytas Kapociunas, on September 20, 2014, over "an allegation of sexual intercourse with a child outside Australia.",

In 2015, Kapociunas was found not guilty on two charges and on the third charge, the jury was unable to reach a verdict.

References

Year of birth missing (living people)
Living people
Australian women ambassadors
Ambassadors of Australia to Spain
Australian consuls
Monash University alumni
Australian National University alumni
Flinders University alumni
University of South Australia alumni
Ambassadors of Australia to Andorra
Ambassadors of Australia to Equatorial Guinea